"Bout" is a song by English singer Jamelia. It was written by Jamelia and Colin Emmanuel for her second studio album Thank You (2003), while production was helmed by the latter. The song samples from American composer Bill Conti's record "Gonna Fly Now" (1976). Her first release in three years, it was released by Parlophone Records on 21 February 2003 in the United Kingdom. A minor commercial hit, it peaked at number 37 on the UK Singles Chart.

Music video
A music video for "Bout" was directed by Barnaby Roper.

Track listing

Charts

References

2003 songs
Jamelia songs
Songs written by Jamelia
Songs written by Colin Emmanuel
Parlophone singles
2003 singles